Manfred Albrecht Freiherr von Richthofen (2 May 1892 – 21 April 1918), known in English as Baron von Richthofen or the Red Baron, was a fighter pilot with the German Air Force during World War I. He is considered the ace-of-aces of the war, being officially credited with 80 air combat victories.

Originally a cavalryman, Richthofen transferred to the Air Service in 1915, becoming one of the first members of fighter squadron Jagdstaffel 2 in 1916. He quickly distinguished himself as a fighter pilot, and during 1917 became the leader of Jasta 11. Later he led the larger fighter wing Jagdgeschwader I, better known as "The Flying Circus" or "Richthofen's Circus" because of the bright colours of its aircraft, and perhaps also because of the way the unit was transferred from one area of Allied air activity to another – moving like a travelling circus, and frequently setting up in tents on improvised airfields. By 1918, Richthofen was regarded as a national hero in Germany, and respected by his enemies.

Richthofen was shot down and killed near Vaux-sur-Somme on 21 April 1918. There has been considerable discussion and debate regarding aspects of his career, especially the circumstances of his death. He remains one of the most widely known fighter pilots of all time, and has been the subject of many books, films, and other media.

Name and nicknames
Richthofen was a Freiherr (literally "Free Lord"), a title of nobility often translated as "baron." This is not a given name nor strictly a hereditary title, since all male members of the family were entitled to it, even during the lifetime of their father.  Richthofen painted his aircraft red, and this combined with his title led to him being called the "Red Baron", both inside and outside Germany. During his lifetime, he was more frequently described in German as Der Rote Kampfflieger, variously translated as "The Red Battle Flyer" or "The Red Fighter Pilot". This name was used as the title of Richthofen's 1917 autobiography.

Early life

Richthofen was born in Kleinburg, near Breslau, Lower Silesia (now part of the city of Wrocław, Poland), on 2 May 1892 into a prominent Prussian aristocratic family. His father was Major Albrecht Philipp Karl Julius Freiherr von Richthofen and his mother was Kunigunde von Schickfuss und Neudorff. He had an elder sister, Ilse, and two younger brothers.

When he was four years old, Manfred moved with his family to nearby Schweidnitz (now Świdnica, Poland). He enjoyed riding horses and hunting as well as gymnastics at school. He excelled at parallel bars and won a number of awards at school. He and his brothers, Lothar and Bolko, hunted wild boar, elk, birds, and deer.

After being educated at home he attended a school at Schweidnitz for a year before beginning cadet training at the Wahlstatt (now Legnickie Pole, Poland) military school when he was 11. After completing cadet training at the Groß-Lichterfelde Preußische Hauptkadettenanstalt in 1911, he joined an Uhlan cavalry unit, the Ulanen-Regiment Kaiser Alexander der III. von Russland (1. Westpreußisches) Nr. 1 ("1st Emperor Alexander III of Russia Uhlan Regiment (1st West Prussian)") and was assigned to the regiment's 3. Eskadron ("No. 3 Squadron").

Early war service
When World War I began, Richthofen served as a cavalry reconnaissance officer on both the Eastern and Western Fronts, seeing action in Russia, France, and Belgium; with the advent of trench warfare, which made traditional cavalry operations outdated and inefficient, Richthofen's regiment was dismounted, serving as dispatch runners and field telephone operators. Disappointed and bored at not being able to directly participate in combat, the last straw for Richthofen was an order to transfer to the army's supply branch. His interest in the Air Service had been aroused by his examination of a German military aircraft behind the lines, and he applied for a transfer to Die Fliegertruppen des deutschen Kaiserreiches (Imperial German Army Air Service), later to be known as the Luftstreitkräfte. He was widely reported to have written in his application for transfer, "I have not gone to war in order to collect cheese and eggs, but for another purpose." His request was granted, and Richthofen joined the flying service at the end of May 1915.

From June to August 1915, Richthofen served as an observer on reconnaissance missions over the Eastern Front with Feldflieger Abteilung 69 ("No. 69 Flying Squadron"). In August 1915, he was transferred to a flying unit in Ostend, a coastal city in Belgium. There he flew with a friend and fellow pilot Georg Zeumer, who would later teach him to fly solo. On being transferred to the Champagne front, he is believed to have shot down an attacking French Farman aircraft aboard an Albatros C.I with his observer's machine gun in a tense battle over French lines; he was not credited with the kill, since it fell behind Allied lines and therefore could not be confirmed.

Piloting career

Manfred von Richthofen had a chance meeting with German ace fighter pilot Oswald Boelcke which led him to enter training as a pilot in October 1915. In February 1916, Manfred "rescued" his brother Lothar from the boredom of training new troops in Luben and encouraged him to transfer to the Fliegertruppe. The next month, Manfred joined Kampfgeschwader 2 ("No. 2 Bomber Squadron") flying a two-seater Albatros C.III. Initially, he appeared to be a below-average pilot. He struggled to control his aircraft, and he crashed during his first flight at the controls. Despite this poor start, he rapidly became attuned to his aircraft. He was over Verdun on 26 April 1916 and fired on a French Nieuport, shooting it down over Fort Douaumont—although he received no official credit. A week later, he decided to ignore more experienced pilots' advice against flying through a thunderstorm. He later noted that he had been "lucky to get through the weather" and vowed never again to fly in such conditions unless ordered to do so.

Richthofen met Oswald Boelcke again in August 1916, after another spell flying two-seaters on the Eastern Front. Boelcke was visiting the east in search of candidates for his newly formed Jasta 2, and he selected Richthofen to join this unit, one of the first German fighter squadrons. Boelcke was killed during a midair collision with a friendly aircraft on 28 October 1916, and Richthofen witnessed the event.

Richthofen scored his first confirmed victory when he engaged Second Lieutenant Lionel Morris and his observer Tom Rees in the skies over Cambrai, France, on 17 September 1916. His autobiography states, "I honoured the fallen enemy by placing a stone on his beautiful grave." He contacted a jeweller in Berlin and ordered a silver cup engraved with the date and the type of enemy aircraft. He continued to celebrate each of his victories in the same manner until he had 60 cups, by which time the dwindling supply of silver in blockaded Germany meant that silver cups could no longer be supplied. Richthofen discontinued his orders at this stage, rather than accept cups made from base metal.

His brother Lothar (40 victories) used risky, aggressive tactics, but Manfred observed a set of maxims known as the "Dicta Boelcke" to assure success for both the squadron and its pilots. He was not a spectacular or aerobatic pilot like his brother or Werner Voss; however, he was a noted tactician and squadron leader and a fine marksman. Typically, he would dive from above to attack with the advantage of the sun behind him, with other pilots of his squadron covering his rear and flanks.

On 23 November 1916, Richthofen shot down his most famous adversary, British ace Major Lanoe Hawker VC, described by Richthofen as "the British Boelcke". The victory came while Richthofen was flying an Albatros D.II and Hawker was flying the older DH.2. After a long dogfight, Hawker was shot in the back of the head as he attempted to escape back to his own lines. After this combat, Richthofen was convinced that he needed a fighter aircraft with more agility, even with a loss of speed. He switched to the Albatros D.III in January 1917, scoring two victories before suffering an in-flight crack in the spar of the aircraft's lower wing on 24 January, and he reverted to the Albatros D.II or Halberstadt D.II for the next five weeks.

Richthofen was flying his Halberstadt on 6 March in combat with F.E.8s of 40 Squadron RFC when his aircraft was shot through the fuel tank, by Edwin Benbow, who was credited with a victory from this fight. Richthofen was able to make a forced landing near Hénin-Liétard without his aircraft catching fire.  He then scored a victory in the Albatros D.II on 9 March, but his Albatros D.III was grounded for the rest of the month so he switched again to a Halberstadt D.II. He returned to his Albatros D.III on 2 April 1917 and scored 22 victories in it before switching to the Albatros D.V in late June. 

Richthofen flew the celebrated Fokker Dr.I triplane from late July 1917, the distinctive three-winged aircraft with which he is most commonly associated—although he did not use the type exclusively until after it was reissued with strengthened wings in November. Only 19 of his 80 kills were made in this type of aircraft, despite the popular link between Richthofen and the Fokker Dr.I. It was his Albatros D.III Serial No. 789/16 that was first painted bright red, in late January 1917, and in which he first earned his name and reputation.

Richthofen championed the development of the Fokker D.VII with suggestions to overcome the deficiencies of the current German fighter aircraft. He never had an opportunity to fly the new type in combat, as he was killed before it entered service.

Flying Circus

Richthofen received the Pour le Mérite in January 1917 after his 16th confirmed kill, the highest military honour in Germany at the time and informally known as "The Blue Max". That same month, he assumed command of Jasta 11, which ultimately included some of the elite German pilots, many of whom he trained himself, and several of whom later became leaders of their own squadrons. Ernst Udet belonged to Richthofen's group and later became Generaloberst Udet. When Lothar joined, the German high command appreciated the propaganda value of two Richthofens fighting together to defeat the enemy in the air.

Richthofen took the flamboyant step of having his Albatros painted red when he became a squadron commander. His autobiography states: "For whatever reasons, one fine day I came upon the idea of having my crate painted glaring red. The result was that absolutely everyone could not help but notice my red bird. In fact, my opponents also seemed to be not entirely unaware [of it]". Thereafter he usually flew in red-painted aircraft, although not all of them were entirely red, nor was the "red" necessarily the brilliant scarlet beloved of model- and replica-builders.

Other members of Jasta 11 soon took to painting parts of their aircraft red. Their official reason seems to have been to make their leader less conspicuous, to avoid having him singled out in a fight. In practice, red colouration became a unit identification. The German high command permitted this practice (in spite of obvious drawbacks from the point of view of intelligence), and German propaganda made much of it by referring to Richthofen as —"the Red Fighter Pilot".

During a visit to her home, the Baron's mother asked him why he risked his life every day, and he said: "For the man in the trenches. I want to ease his hard lot in life by keeping the enemy flyers away from him."

Richthofen led his new unit to unparallelled success, peaking during "Bloody April" 1917. In that month alone, he shot down 22 British aircraft, including four in a single day, raising his official tally to 52. By June, he had become the commander of the first of the new larger "fighter wing" formations; these were highly mobile, combined tactical units that could move at short notice to different parts of the front as required. Richthofen's new command, Jagdgeschwader 1, was composed of fighter squadrons No. 4, 6, 10, and 11. J.G. 1 became widely known as "The Flying Circus" due to the unit's brightly coloured aircraft and its mobility, including the use of tents, trains, and caravans, where appropriate.

Richthofen was a brilliant tactician, building on Boelcke's tactics. Unlike Boelcke, however, he led by example and force of will rather than by inspiration. He was often described as distant, unemotional, and rather humorless, though some colleagues contended otherwise. He was cordial to officers and enlisted men alike; indeed, he urged his pilots to remain on good terms with the mechanics who maintained their aircraft. He taught his pilots the basic rule which he wanted them to fight by: "Aim for the man and don't miss him. If you are fighting a two-seater, get the observer first; until you have silenced the gun, don't bother about the pilot."

Although Richthofen was now performing the duties of a lieutenant colonel (a wing commander in modern Royal Air Force terms), he was never promoted past the relatively junior rank of Rittmeister, equivalent to captain in the British army. The system in the British army was for an officer to hold the rank appropriate to his level of command, if only on a temporary basis, even if he had not been formally promoted. In the German army, it was not unusual for a wartime officer to hold a lower rank than his duties implied; German officers were promoted according to a schedule and not by battlefield promotion. It was also the custom for a son not to hold a higher rank than his father, and Richthofen's father was a reserve major.

Wounded in combat

Richthofen sustained a serious head wound on 6 July 1917, during combat near Wervik, Belgium against a formation of F.E.2d two-seat fighters of No. 20 Squadron RFC, causing instant disorientation and temporary partial blindness. He regained his vision in time to ease the aircraft out of a spin and execute a forced landing in a field in friendly territory. The injury required multiple operations to remove bone splinters from the impact area.

The Red Baron returned to active service against doctor's orders on 25 July, but took convalescent leave from 5 September to 23 October. His wound is thought to have caused lasting damage; he later often suffered from post-flight nausea and headaches, as well as a change in temperament. There is a theory (see below) linking this injury with his eventual death.

Author and hero

During his convalescent leave, Richthofen completed an autobiographic sketch, Der rote Kampfflieger (The Red Battle Flyer, 1917). Written on the instructions of the "Press and Intelligence" (propaganda) section of the Luftstreitkräfte (Air Force), it shows evidence of having been heavily censored and edited. There are, however, passages that are most unlikely to have been inserted by an official editor. Richthofen wrote: "My father discriminates between a sportsman and a butcher. The latter shoots for fun. When I have shot down an Englishman, my hunting passion is satisfied for a quarter of an hour. Therefore I do not succeed in shooting down two Englishmen in succession. If one of them comes down, I have the feeling of complete satisfaction. Only much later have I overcome my instinct and have become a butcher". In another passage, Richthofen wrote "I am in wretched spirits after every aerial combat. I believe that [the war] is not as the people at home imagine it, with a hurrah and a roar; it is very serious, very grim."  An English translation by J. Ellis Barker was published in 1918 as The Red Battle Flyer. Although Richthofen died before a revised version could be prepared, he is on record as repudiating the book, stating that it was "too insolent" and that he was no longer that kind of person.

By 1918, Richthofen had become such a legend that it was feared that his death would be a blow to the morale of the German people. He refused to accept a ground job after his wound, stating that "every poor fellow in the trenches must do his duty" and that he would therefore continue to fly in combat. Certainly he had become part of a cult of officially encouraged hero-worship. German propaganda circulated various false rumours, including that the British had raised squadrons specially to hunt Richthofen and had offered large rewards and an automatic Victoria Cross to any Allied pilot who shot him down. Passages from his correspondence indicate he may have at least half-believed some of these stories himself.

Death

Richthofen received a fatal wound just after 11:00 am on 21 April 1918 while flying over Morlancourt Ridge near the Somme River, . At the time, he had been pursuing, at very low altitude, a Sopwith Camel piloted by Canadian novice Wilfrid Reid "Wop" May of No. 209 Squadron, Royal Air Force. May had just fired on the Red Baron's cousin, Lieutenant Wolfram von Richthofen. On seeing his cousin being attacked, Richthofen flew to his rescue and fired on May, causing him to pull away. Richthofen pursued May across the Somme. The Baron was spotted and briefly attacked by a Camel piloted by May's school friend and flight commander, Canadian Captain Arthur "Roy" Brown. Brown had to dive steeply at very high speed to intervene, and then had to climb steeply to avoid hitting the ground. Richthofen turned to avoid this attack, and then resumed his pursuit of May.

It was almost certainly during this final stage in his pursuit of May that a single .303 bullet hit Richthofen through the chest, severely damaging his heart and lungs; it would have killed Richthofen in less than a minute. The aircraft bounced heavily upon hitting the ground: the undercarriage collapsed and the fuel tank was smashed before the aircraft skidded to a stop. Several witnesses, including Gunner George Ridgway, reached the crashed plane and found Richthofen already dead, and his face slammed into the butts of his machine guns, breaking his nose, fracturing his jaw and creating contusions on his face.

No. 3 Squadron, Australian Flying Corps was the nearest Allied air unit and assumed responsibility for the Baron's remains. His Fokker Dr.I 425/17 was soon taken apart by souvenir hunters.

In 2009, Richthofen's death certificate was found in the archives in Ostrów Wielkopolski, Poland. He had briefly been stationed in Ostrów before going to war, as it was part of Germany until the end of World War I. The document is a one-page, handwritten form in a 1918 registry book of deaths. It misspells Richthofen's name as "Richthoven" and simply states that he had "died 21 April 1918, from wounds sustained in combat".

Debate over who fired the shot that killed Richthofen

Controversy and contradictory hypotheses continue to surround who actually fired the shot that killed Richthofen.

The RAF credited Brown with shooting down the Red Baron, but it is now generally agreed by historians, doctors, and ballistics experts that Richthofen was actually killed by an anti-aircraft (AA) machine gunner firing from the ground. A post mortem examination of the body showed the bullet that killed Richthofen penetrated from the right underarm and exited next to the left nipple. Brown's attack was probably from behind and above Richthofen's left. Even more conclusively, Richthofen could not have continued his pursuit of May for as long as he did (up to two minutes) had his wound come from Brown. Brown himself never spoke much about what happened that day, claiming, "There is no point in me commenting, as the evidence is already out there."

Many sources have suggested that Sergeant Cedric Popkin was the person most likely to have killed Richthofen, including a 1998 article by Geoffrey Miller, a physician, and historian of military medicine, and a 2002 edition of the British Channel 4 Secret History series. Popkin was an AA machine gunner with the Australian 24th Machine Gun Company, and he was using a Vickers gun. He fired at Richthofen's aircraft on two occasions: first as the Baron was heading straight at his position, and then at long range from the plane's right. Given the nature of Richthofen's wounds, Popkin was in a position to fire the fatal shot when the pilot passed him for a second time. Some confusion has been caused by a letter that Popkin wrote in 1935 to an Australian official historian. It stated Popkin's belief that he had fired the fatal shot as Richthofen flew straight at his position. In this respect, Popkin was incorrect; the bullet which caused the Baron's death came from the side (see above).

A 2002 Discovery Channel documentary suggests that Gunner W. J. "Snowy" Evans, a Lewis machine gunner with the 53rd Battery, 14th Field Artillery Brigade, Royal Australian Artillery is likely to have killed von Richthofen. Miller and the Secret History documentary dismiss this theory because of the angle from which Evans fired at Richthofen.

Other sources have suggested that Gunner Robert Buie (also of the 53rd Battery) may have fired the fatal shot. There is little support for this theory. In 2007, a municipality in Sydney recognised Buie as the man who shot down Richthofen, placing a plaque near his former home. Buie died in 1964 and has never been officially recognised in any other way.

Theories about last combat
Richthofen was a highly experienced and skilled fighter pilot—fully aware of the risk from ground fire. Further, he concurred with the rules of air fighting created by his late mentor Boelcke, who specifically advised pilots not to take unnecessary risks. In this context, Richthofen's judgement during his last combat was clearly unsound in several respects. Several theories have been proposed to account for his behaviour.

In 1999, a German medical researcher, Henning Allmers, published an article in the British medical journal The Lancet, suggesting it was likely that brain damage from the head wound Richthofen suffered in July 1917 played a part in his death. This was supported by a 2004 paper by researchers at the University of Texas. Richthofen's behaviour after his injury was noted as consistent with brain-injured patients, and such an injury could account for his perceived lack of judgement on his final flight: flying too low over enemy territory and suffering target fixation.

Richthofen may have been suffering from cumulative combat stress, which made him fail to observe some of his usual precautions. One of the leading British air aces, Major Edward "Mick" Mannock, was killed by ground fire on 26 July 1918 while crossing the lines at low level, an action he had always cautioned his younger pilots against. One of the most popular of the French air aces, Georges Guynemer, went missing on 11 September 1917, probably while attacking a two-seater without realizing several Fokkers were escorting it.

There is a suggestion that on the day of Richthofen's death, the prevailing wind was about  easterly, rather than the usual  westerly. This was considerably faster than normal and he could easily have strayed over enemy lines without realizing it.

At the time of Richthofen's death, the front was in a highly fluid state, following the initial success of the German offensive of March–April 1918. This was part of Germany's last opportunity to win the war. In the face of Allied air superiority, the German air service was having difficulty acquiring vital reconnaissance information, and could do little to prevent Allied squadrons from completing effective reconnaissance and close support of their armies.

Burial

In common with most Allied air officers, No. 3 Squadron AFC's commanding officer Major David Blake, who was responsible for Richthofen's body, regarded the Red Baron with great respect, and he organised a full military funeral.

The body was buried in the cemetery at the village of Bertangles, near Amiens, on 22 April 1918. Six of No. 3 Squadron's officers served as pallbearers, and a guard of honour from the squadron's other ranks fired a salute.

Allied squadrons stationed nearby presented memorial wreaths, one of which was inscribed with the words, "To Our Gallant and Worthy Foe".

In the early 1920s, the French authorities created a military cemetery at Fricourt, in which a large number of German war dead, including Richthofen, were reinterred. In 1925 von Richthofen's youngest brother, Bolko, recovered the body from Fricourt and took it to Germany. The family's intention was for it to be buried in the Schweidnitz cemetery next to the graves of his father and his brother Lothar von Richthofen, who had been killed in a post-war air crash in 1922. The German Government requested that the body should instead be interred at the Invalidenfriedhof Cemetery in Berlin, where many German military heroes and past leaders were buried, and the family agreed. Richthofen's body received a state funeral. Later the Third Reich held a further grandiose memorial ceremony at the site of the grave, erecting a massive new tombstone engraved with the single word: Richthofen. During the Cold War, the Invalidenfriedhof was on the boundary of the Soviet zone in Berlin, and the tombstone became damaged by bullets fired at attempted escapees from East Germany. In 1975 the body was moved to a Richthofen family grave plot at the Südfriedhof in Wiesbaden.

Number of victories

For decades after World War I, some authors questioned whether Richthofen had achieved 80 victories, insisting that his record was exaggerated for propaganda purposes. Some claimed that he took credit for aircraft downed by his squadron or wing.

In fact, Richthofen's victories are unusually well documented. A full list of the aircraft the Red Baron was credited with shooting down was published as early as 1958—with documented RFC/RAF squadron details, aircraft serial numbers, and the identities of Allied airmen killed or captured—73 of the 80 listed match recorded British losses. A study conducted by British historian Norman Franks with two colleagues, published in Under the Guns of the Red Baron in 1998, reached the same conclusion about the high degree of accuracy of Richthofen's claimed victories. There were also unconfirmed victories that would put his actual total as high as 100 or more.

For comparison, the highest-scoring Allied ace, the Frenchman René Fonck, achieved 75 confirmed victories and a further 52 unconfirmed behind enemy lines. The highest-scoring British Empire fighter pilots were Canadian Billy Bishop, who was officially credited with 72 victories, British Mick Mannock, with 61 confirmed victories, Canadian Raymond Collishaw, with 60, and British James McCudden, with 57 confirmed victories.

Richthofen's early victories and the establishment of his reputation coincided with a period of German air superiority, but he achieved many of his successes later on against a numerically superior enemy, who flew fighter aircraft that were, on the whole, better than his own.

Orders and decorations, tributes, and relics

Orders and decorations 
In order of date awarded

German Empire / German Federal States 
 Prussian Military Pilot Badge
 Honour Goblet for the Winner in Air Combat
 Iron Cross, 1st Class (10 April 1916), 2nd Class (23 September 1914)
 Duke Carl Eduard Medal with Sword Clasp (9 November 1916)
 Knight's Cross of the Royal House Order of Hohenzollern with Swords (11 November 1916)
 Pour le Mérite (12 January 1917)
 Knight's Cross of the Military Order of St. Henry (16 April 1917)
 Order of the Red Eagle, 3rd Class with Crown and Swords (2 April 1918)
 Knight's Cross of the Saxe-Ernestine House Order, 1st Class with Crown and Swords
 Military Merit Order (Bavaria) 4th Class with Swords 
 Knight's Cross of the Württemberg Military Merit Order
 Hessian Bravery Medal
 Cross for Faithful Service
 Lippe War Merit Cross, 2nd Class
 Cross of War of Honour for a Heroic Deed
 Brunswick War Merit Cross, 2nd Class
 Wound Badge, 3rd Class (1918)
 Hanseatic Crosses of the Three Hanseatic Cities of Bremen, Hamburg, and Lübeck

Austro-Hungarian Empire 
 Order of the Iron Crown, 3rd Class
 Austro-Hungarian Military Merit Cross, 3rd Class with War Decorations
 Field Pilot Badge

Ottoman Empire 
 Iron Crescent
 Silver Imtiyaz Medal
 Silver Liakat Medal

Kingdom of Bulgaria 
 Military Order for Bravery, 4th Class (12 June 1917)

Tributes
At various times, several different German military aviation Geschwader (literally "squadrons"; equivalent to Commonwealth air force "groups", French escadrons or USAF "wings") have been named after the Baron:
 Jagdgeschwader 132 "Richthofen" (1 April 1936 – 1 November 1938)—Wehrmacht aviation unit
 Jagdgeschwader 131 "Richthofen" (1 November 1938 – 1 May 1939)—Luftwaffe
 Jagdgeschwader 2 "Richthofen" (1 May 1939 – 7 May 1945)—Luftwaffe
 Jagdgeschwader 71 "Richthofen" (from 6 June 1959)—the first jet-fighter unit established by the post-World War II German Bundeswehr ("federal defence force"); its founding commander was the most successful air ace in history, Erich Hartmann.

In 1941 a newly launched Kriegsmarine (German navy) seaplane tender received the name .

In 1968 Richthofen was inducted into the International Air & Space Hall of Fame.

"Red Flag", the US Air Force's large scale training exercise held multiple times a year, was an outgrowth of Project Red Baron, which happened in three phases ( to ) during the period of the Vietnam War.

Relics
Captain Roy Brown donated the seat of the Fokker triplane in which the German flying ace made his final flight to the Royal Canadian Military Institute (RCMI) in 1920.
Apart from the triplane's seat, the RCMI, in Toronto, also holds a side panel signed by the pilots of Brown's squadron.
The engine of Richthofen's Dr.I was donated to the Imperial War Museum in London, where it is still on display. The museum also holds the Baron's machine guns. The control column (joystick) of Richthofen's aircraft can be seen at the Australian War Memorial in Canberra.
The Australian National Aviation Museum has what is suspected to be the fuel tank of Richthofen's Dr.I, however there is no conclusive proof.

Published works

See also
The Red Baron in popular culture
List of World War I flying aces

References

Notes

Citations

Bibliography

Baker, David. Manfred von Richthofen: The Man and the Aircraft He Flew. McGregor, Minnesota: Voyageur Press, 1991. .
Bodenschatz, Karl. Hunting With Richthofen: Sixteen Months of Battle with J G Freiherr Von Richthofen No. 1. London: Grub Street, 1998. .
Burrows, William E. Richthofen: A True History of the Red Baron. London: Rupert Hart-Davis, 1970. .
English, Dave. The Air Up There: More Great Quotations on Flight. Chicago, Illinois: McGraw-Hill Professional, 2003. .
Franks, Norman; Bailey, Frank W.; Guest, Russell. Above the Lines: The Aces and Fighter Units of the German Air Service, Naval Air Service and Flanders Marine Corps, 1914–1918. Grub Street, 1993. , .
Franks, Norman and Frank W. Bailey. Over the Front: A Complete Record of Fighter Aces and Units of the United States and French Air Services, 1914–1918. London: Grub Street, 1992. .
Franks, Norman, Hal Giblin and Nigel McCrery. Under the Guns of the Red Baron: Complete Record of Von Richthofen's Victories and Victims. London: Grub Street, 2007, First edition 1995. .
Gibbons, Floyd, The Red Knight of Germany: The Story of Baron von Richthofen, German's Great War Bird. New York: Doubleday, Page & Company, 1927.
Grey, Peter and Owen Thetford. German Aircraft of the First World War. London: Putnam, 2nd ed., 1970. .
Guttman, Jon. Pusher Aces of World War 1 (Aircraft of the Aces #88). Oxford, UK: Osprey Publishing Co, 2009. .
Kilduff, Peter.The Red Baron: Beyond the Legend. London: Cassell, 1994. .
McAllister, Hayden, ed. Flying Stories. London: Octopus Books, 1982. .
O'Connor, Neal W. The Aviation Awards of the Grand Duchies of Baden and Oldenburg Foundation of Aviation World War I: Aviation Awards of Imperial Germany in World War I and the Men Who Earned Them – Volume VI. Stratford, Connecticut: Flying Machines Press, 1999. .
Preußen, Kriegsministerium, Geheime Kriegs-Kanzlei. Rangliste der Königlich Preußischen Armee und des XIII. Berlin: Ernst Siegfried Mittler und Sohn, 1914.
Robertson, Bruce (ed.) von Richthofen and the Flying Circus. Letchworth, UK: Harleyford, 1958.
Robertson, Linda R. The Dream of Civilized Warfare: World War I Flying Aces and the American Imagination. Minneapolis, Minnesota: University of Minnesota Press, 2005. .
Shores, Christopher; Norman Franks; Russell Guest. Above the Trenches: A Complete Record of the Fighter Aces and Units of the British Empire Air Forces 1915–1920. Grub Street, 1990. , .
Von Richthofen, Manfred. The Red Baron. Norderstedt, Germany: BOD, 2008 (reprint). .
Von Richthofen, Manfred. Red Fighter Pilot: The Autobiography of the Red Baron. St Petersburg, Florida: Red and Black Publishers, 2007 (reprint). .
Von Richthofen, Manfred. The Red Baron. Translated by Peter Kilduff. Garden City, New York: Doubleday, 1969.
Wright, Nicolas. The Red Baron. London: Sidgwick & Jackson, 1976. .

Concerning death
Allmers, Dr. Henning. "Manfred Freiherr von Richthofen's Medical Record: Was the "Red Baron" fit to fly?" Lancet 1999, 354: pp. 502–504.
Day, Mark. "Unsung No.1 with a bullet – World War I ace Manfred von Richthofen seems to have met his match in an Australian gunner." The Australian News Corporation, 30 April 2007. Retrieved: 30 April 2007.
Franks, Norman and Alan Bennett. The Red Baron's Last Flight: A Mystery Investigated. London: Grub Street, 2007, First edition 1997. 
Miller, Geoffrey. "The Death of Manfred von Richthofen: Who fired the fatal shot?" Sabretache: Journal and Proceedings of the Military History Society of Australia, Vol. XXXIX, No. 2.
Titler, Dale. The Day the Red Baron Died. New York: Ballantine Books, 1970. .

External links

Complete text of The Red Fighter Pilot by Manfred von Richthofen  at The War Times Journal
Combat record
Historic footage of Manfred von Richthofen posing and conversing with fellow pilots, circa 1917.
Silent historical film of the 1918 funeral of Captain Baron von Richthofen provided by Australian Screen Online
Footage of the reburial of The Red Baron in 1925

|-

|-

 
1892 births
1918 deaths
Articles containing video clips
Aviators killed by being shot down
Barons of Germany
Burials in Hesse
German military personnel killed in World War I
German World War I flying aces
Luftstreitkräfte personnel
Military personnel from Wrocław
People from the Province of Silesia
Prussian Army personnel
Recipients of the Military Merit Order (Bavaria)
Recipients of the Order of Bravery, 4th class
Recipients of the Pour le Mérite (military class)
Recipients of the Hanseatic Cross (Bremen)
Recipients of the Hanseatic Cross (Lübeck)
Recipients of the Silver Imtiyaz Medal
Recipients of the Silver Liakat Medal
Manfred von Richthofen
Shot-down aviators